Rauna Municipality is a former municipality in Vidzeme, Latvia. The municipality was formed in 2009 by merging Drusti parish and Rauna parish, the administrative centre being Rauna. The population in 2020 was 3,019.

On 1 July 2021, Rauna Municipality ceased to exist and its territory was merged into Smiltene Municipality.

See also 
 Administrative divisions of Latvia (2009)

References 

 
Former municipalities of Latvia